A list of films produced in Italy in 1921 (see 1921 in film):

External links
 Italian films of 1921 at the Internet Movie Database

Italian
1921
Films